Norman Grant may refer to:

 Norman Grant, musician and lead singer of The Twinkle Brothers
 Norman Grant (cricketer) (1891-1966), Australian cricketer
 Norman Grant (politician), Jamaican politician